This is a list of cases reported in volume 299 of United States Reports, decided by the Supreme Court of the United States in 1936 and 1937.

Justices of the Supreme Court at the time of volume 299 U.S. 

The Supreme Court is established by Article III, Section 1 of the Constitution of the United States, which says: "The judicial Power of the United States, shall be vested in one supreme Court . . .". The size of the Court is not specified; the Constitution leaves it to Congress to set the number of justices. Under the Judiciary Act of 1789 Congress originally fixed the number of justices at six (one chief justice and five associate justices). Since 1789 Congress has varied the size of the Court from six to seven, nine, ten, and back to nine justices (always including one chief justice).

When the cases in volume 299 were decided the Court comprised the following nine members:

Notable Case in 299 U.S.

De Jonge v. Oregon
In De Jonge v. Oregon,  299 U.S. 353 (1937), the Supreme Court held that that the Fourteenth Amendment's due process clause applies freedom of assembly against the states. The Court found that De Jonge had the right to speak at a peaceful public meeting held by the Communist Party, even though the party generally advocated an industrial or political change in revolution. However, in the 1950s with the fear of communism on the rise, the Court ruled in Dennis v. United States (1951) that Eugene Dennis, who was the leader of the Communist Party, violated the Smith Act by advocating the forcible overthrow of the United States government.

Federal court system 

Under the Judiciary Act of 1789 the federal court structure at the time comprised District Courts, which had general trial jurisdiction; Circuit Courts, which had mixed trial and appellate (from the US District Courts) jurisdiction; and the United States Supreme Court, which had appellate jurisdiction over the federal District and Circuit courts—and for certain issues over state courts. The Supreme Court also had limited original jurisdiction (i.e., in which cases could be filed directly with the Supreme Court without first having been heard by a lower federal or state court). There were one or more federal District Courts and/or Circuit Courts in each state, territory, or other geographical region.

The Judiciary Act of 1891 created the United States Courts of Appeals and reassigned the jurisdiction of most routine appeals from the district and circuit courts to these appellate courts. The Act created nine new courts that were originally known as the "United States Circuit Courts of Appeals." The new courts had jurisdiction over most appeals of lower court decisions. The Supreme Court could review either legal issues that a court of appeals certified or decisions of court of appeals by writ of certiorari. On January 1, 1912, the effective date of the Judicial Code of 1911, the old Circuit Courts were abolished, with their remaining trial court jurisdiction transferred to the U.S. District Courts.

List of cases in volume 299 U.S. 

[a] VanDevanter took no part in the case
[b] Stone took no part in the case (Stone missed numerous cases listed above due to illness)
[c] Roberts took no part in the case
[d] Brandeis took no part in the case

Notes and references

External links
  Case reports in volume 299 from Library of Congress
  Case reports in volume 299 from Court Listener
  Case reports in volume 299 from the Caselaw Access Project of Harvard Law School
  Case reports in volume 299 from Google Scholar
  Case reports in volume 299 from Justia
  Case reports in volume 299 from Open Jurist
 Website of the United States Supreme Court
 United States Courts website about the Supreme Court
 National Archives, Records of the Supreme Court of the United States
 American Bar Association, How Does the Supreme Court Work?
 The Supreme Court Historical Society